Founders Pledge is a London-based charitable initiative, where entrepreneurs make a commitment to donate a portion of their personal proceeds to charity when they sell their business. Inspired by effective altruism, the mission of Founders Pledge is to "empower entrepreneurs to do immense good".

By May 2021, around 1,500 entrepreneurs across 30 countries have signed up to Founders Pledge. Collectively, they have pledged to donate $3 billion in share value (of which $475 million in donations have been completed to date).

History

Founders Pledge was initially launched in 2015 by the Founders Forum for Good, which focuses on helping social entrepreneurs build and scale businesses. David Goldberg, co-founder and CEO of Founders Pledge, has stated that the ideas of effective altruism, and the work of 80,000 Hours in particular, have influenced the trajectory of the organization.

Founders Pledge was named one of the New Radicals 2016, which are "innovative projects chosen by The Observer and Nesta as making a real difference to society".

Starting in London, Founders Pledge has since expanded and opened multiple new offices in cities such as Berlin, New York and San Francisco. In addition, Founders Pledge has launched partnerships with organisations including Y Combinator, MassChallenge, and Forward Partners. In September 2016, Sam Altman, president of Y Combinator, wrote on the Y Combinator blog: "Many of our founders ask us about how they can donate part of their equity or post exit proceeds, and now we have an answer: Founders Pledge."

Since 2016, Founders Pledge was awarded two major grants⁠—totaling more than $6 million⁠—from the Open Philanthropy Project, a foundation largely funded by Facebook co-founder Dustin Moskovitz.

Activities 
Founders Pledge runs three main types of activities, all of which are free of charge for its members.

 First, they aim to build a community of impact-driven entrepreneurs by organizing events to educate members on evidence-backed impact strategies.
 Second, they provide administrative support with donations and offer a donor-advised fund.
 Third, Founders Pledge conducts research on high-leverage giving opportunities and advises its members on where to give based on their personal values.

Research 
Founders Pledge partners with GiveWell for its research on cost-effective global health and development charities. In addition, Founders Pledge has written research reports on various topics, including:

 impact investing,
 climate change,
 evidence-based policy,
 animal welfare,
 mental health,
 and the mitigation of existential risks.

Members

Entrepreneurs signing up to Founders Pledge enter a legally binding commitment to donate a portion of their personal proceeds on liquidity to charity. The minimum commitment is 2%, though on average entrepreneurs commit around 7%. Comparing several donation pledging initiatives, Vox writes that Founders Pledge forces The Giving Pledge "to compete for the mindshare of today’s tech community".

A complete list of members is available on the Founders Pledge website. Notable members of Founders Pledge include the following:

 Mustafa Suleyman, co-founder of Google DeepMind
 Kathryn Petralia, Co-founder & COO of Kabbage
 Roy Bahat, Head of Bloomberg Beta 
 Niklas Adalberth, Founder of Klarna and Norrsken Foundation
 Andrew Fisher, Executive Chairman of Shazam
 Eric Wahlforss, Founder & CPO of SoundCloud
 Uma Valeti, Founder & CEO of Upside Foods
 Esben Kran, CEO & Logo designer

See also 

 Earning to give
 GiveWell
 Giving What We Can
 Raising for Effective Giving

References

External links
 

Altruism
Charities based in London
Charity fundraising
Companies based in the London Borough of Southwark
Organizations established in 2015
2015 establishments in the United Kingdom
Organizations associated with effective altruism